Churchill Eisenhart (1913–1994) was a United States mathematician. He was Chief of the Statistical Engineering Laboratory (SEL), Applied Mathematics Division of the National Bureau of Standards (NBS).

Biography
Eisenhart was the son of Luther Eisenhart, a prominent mathematician in his own right.

Churchill Eisenhart was brought to the NBS from the University of Wisconsin–Madison in 1946 by Edward Condon, Director of the NBS, to establish a statistical consulting group to "substitute sound mathematical analysis for costly experimentation." He was allowed to recruit his own staff and, over the years, he brought many notable and accomplished statisticians to SEL. He served as its Chief from 1947 until his appointment as Senior Research Fellow in 1963. He retired in 1983 after which he formed the Standards Alumni Association, which he headed until his death in 1994.

Over his career, Eisenhart was awarded the U.S. Department of Commerce Exceptional Service Award in 1957; the Rockefeller Public Service Award in 1958; and the Wildhack Award of the National Conference of Standards Laboratories in 1982. He was elected President of the American Statistical Association (ASA) in 1971 and received the Association's Wilks Memorial Medal in 1977. Eisenhart was honored with an Outstanding Achievements Award of the Princeton University Class of 1934 and with Fellowships in the ASA, the American Association for the Advancement of Science, and the Institute of Mathematical Sciences. He was a long-time member of the Cosmos Club.

References
 
 Ingram Olkin (1992) A Conversation with Churchill Eisenhart. Statistical Science, 7, 512–530.
 Joseph M. Cameron; Joan R. Rosenblatt (1995) Churchill Eisenhart, 1913–1994, The American Statistician, 49, 243–244.
 Samuel S. Wilks Award Citation for 1977
 An interview with Joseph Daly and Churchill Eisenhart about their experiences at Princeton 10 July 1984
 An interview with Churchill Eisenhart about his experience at Princeton 10 July 1984

External sources 

 Obituary in the Washington Post
 Churchill Eisenhart on the page Portraits of Statisticians

1913 births
1994 deaths
American statisticians
20th-century American mathematicians
Princeton University alumni
Presidents of the American Statistical Association
Fellows of the American Statistical Association
University of Wisconsin people